Ye Vagabonds is an Irish folk music duo consisting of Dublin-based brothers Diarmuid and Brían Mac Gloinn. Having been described as "being at the fore of a new wave of Irish folk", they won three awards at the 2019 RTÉ Radio 1 Folk Awards: Best Track (for a recording of "Foggy Dew"), Best Album (their 2019 album The Hare's Lament), and Best Folk Group. Ye Vagabonds are signed to River Lea, which is described as an offshoot of Rough Trade Records. They are currently working on a fourth album.

Artistry

Musical style and themes 
Diarmuid has described the duo's style as being "connected with the Ulster singing tradition with harmonies that draw on American traditional music". Having grown up speaking Irish at home, they have released several songs in the language.

Discography

Albums 
Rose & Briar (EP, 2015)
 Ye Vagabonds (2017)
The Hare’s Lament (2019)
Nine Waves (2022)

Singles 

 I'm a Rover/ The Bothy Lads (2021)

Awards

References

External links

Folk music duos
Musical groups from Dublin (city)
Irish musical duos
Irish folk musical groups